Pierre Dospital (born May 15, 1950) is a French retired rugby union player who played at prop for the France national rugby union team and for the French rugby union club Aviron Bayonnais.

Early life and career 
Pierre Dospital was born on May 15, 1950 in Itxassou in south-western France.

Dospital made his debut for the France national rugby union team on December 10, 1977.

He made a total of 24 official appearances for the French national team.

Dospital also played for the French rugby union club Aviron Bayonnais and was capped twice for the French Barbarians in 1984 and 1986.

See also 

 France national rugby union team
 Barbarian Rugby Club

References 

French rugby union players
Rugby union props
Living people
1950 births
France international rugby union players